Modern Creation is the fifth album by American garage rock band The Whigs, released on April 22, 2014 by New West. It was recorded within two weeks in Valencia, California. The producer of the album was Jim Scott, who has worked with such artists as Tom Petty, Dixie Chicks, and Red Hot Chili Peppers.

On April 16, 2014, the lead single, Hit Me, was released on YouTube.

Track listing

Reception

Modern Creation received positive reviews from critics. It has a score of 75 out of 100 on Metacritic, based on reviews from 5 critics, indicating "generally favorable reviews".

References

2014 albums
The Whigs (band) albums
Albums produced by Jim Scott (producer)